Mumbai Magicians (abbreviated as MM) was a field hockey team based in Mumbai, Maharashtra that played in the Hockey India League from 2012 to 2014. It was owned by Dabur India Ltd.  Australian coach Ric Charlesworth served as the head coach for the team.

Franchisee Details

Ownership
The team was owned by the Burman family, promoters of fast-moving consumer goods (FMCG) major Dabur India Ltd. The Burman family is the promoter of one of the largest and the oldest Indian consumer products company, Dabur India Ltd. The family also has interests in Life Insurance, General Insurance, Banking firms, Healthcare, besides Private Equity and Food & Beverage Retail.

Team Composition

Statistics

Hat-tricks

Fixtures and Results

 Goals For: 20 (1.67 per match)
 Goals Against: 32 (2.67 per match)
 Most Goals: 11 (Overall: 1st)
 Sandeep Singh

2014

 Goals For: 19 (1.90 per match)
 Goals Against: 29 (2.90 per match)
 Most Goals: 7
 Glenn Turner

References

See also
Hockey India League

Hockey India League teams
Field hockey in Maharashtra
2012 establishments in Maharashtra